The 1994 New Brunswick electoral redistribution was the first re-alignment of electoral districts in New Brunswick, Canada, since 1973.  Under this redistribution, several districts were changed significantly due to considerable population shifts from the northern part of the province to the south.  The total number of districts was reduced from 58 to 55. Due to considerable population shifts over the course of two decades, some ridings were merged, while others were split in two, and some were unchanged.

The draft recommendations of new districts was created by a royal commission appointed by Premier Frank McKenna in late 1991, which completed its report in 1993.  The report was then referred to the provincial legislature which made changes, including the addition of a district and several boundary and name changes.  The changes to districts were proclaimed into law in 1994.

Largely unchanged districts

Merged districts

New districts

Politics of New Brunswick
Electoral redistributions in Canada
New Brunswick Legislature
1994 in politics
1994 in Canadian politics
1994 in New Brunswick